Hernán Fernández (born 14 June 1984 in Río Tercero, Córdoba) is an Argentine football defender. He currently plays for Sarmiento Resistencia.

External links 

Living people
1984 births
Sportspeople from Córdoba Province, Argentina
Association football defenders
FK Dinamo Tirana players
Argentine expatriate sportspeople in Albania
Expatriate footballers in Albania
Argentine footballers